He Walked by Night is a 1948 American police procedural film noir directed by Alfred L. Werker and an uncredited Anthony Mann. The film, shot in semidocumentary tone, is loosely based on the real-life actions of Erwin "Machine-Gun" Walker, a former Glendale, California police department employee and World War II veteran who unleashed a crime spree of burglaries, robberies and shootouts in the Los Angeles area in 1945 and 1946.

During production, actor Jack Webb met the film's police technical advisor Marty Wynn and was inspired by a conversation with Wynn to create the radio program Dragnet, which later became a television series.

He Walked by Night was released by Eagle-Lion Films. The film is notable for its camerawork by renowned film noir cinematographer John Alton.

Today the film is in the public domain.

Plot
On a Los Angeles street, Officer Rawlins, a patrolman on his way home from work, stops a man whom he suspects of being a burglar and is shot and mortally wounded. The minor clues lead nowhere. Two police detectives, Marty Brennan and Chuck Jones, are assigned to catch the killer, Roy Morgan, a brilliant mystery man with no known criminal past. Morgan is hiding in a Hollywood bungalow and listening to police calls on his custom radio in an attempt to avoid capture. His only relationship is with his small dog.

Roy consigns stolen electronic equipment to Paul Reeves and is nearly caught when he tries to collect on his property. Reeves tells police that the suspect is a mystery man named Roy Martin. The case crosses the paths of Brennan and Jones, who stake out Reeves's office to arrest and question Roy. However, Roy suspects a trap, and in a brief shootout, he shoots and paralyzes Jones. Jones wounds Roy, who performs surgery on himself to remove the bullet and to avoid the hospital, where his wound would be reported to the police. With his knowledge of police procedures, Roy changes his modus operandi and becomes an armed robber. During one robbery, he fires his semiautomatic pistol and the police recover the ejected casing. Forensics specialist Lee Whitey matches the ejector marks on the casing to those recovered in the killing of Rawlins and the wounding of Jones, connecting all three shootings to one suspect.

Captain Breen uses the break in the case to gather all of the witnesses to the robberies. They assist Lee in building a composite sketch of the killer. Reeves then identifies Roy from the composite. However, Roy hides in Reeves's car and attempts to intimidate him into revealing details of the police investigation. He barely eludes a stakeout of Reeves's house.

Because the police do not realize that Roy has inside knowledge of their work, the case goes nowhere, and Breen removes Brennan from the case. Jones convinces his partner to stop viewing the case personally. Brennan uses the composite photograph, which results in information that Roy, whose actual name is Roy Morgan, worked for a local police department as a civilian radio technician before he was drafted into the army. Brennan finds Roy with the help of mailmen and disguises himself as a milkman to sneak a close look at Roy and his apartment.

The police surround and raid the apartment that night, but Roy, alerted by his dog's barking, flees through the attic and uses the Los Angeles storm-drainage tunnel system as a means of escape. A dragnet and a chase through the drainage tunnels ensue. Roy is finally cornered by the police in a passage when his exit is blocked by the wheel of a police car atop a manhole cover. As police tear gas affects Roy, he staggers and fires one last time at them. He is then shot and killed.

Cast
 Richard Basehart as Roy Martin/Roy Morgan
 Scott Brady as Sgt. Marty Brennan
 Roy Roberts as Captain Breen
 Whit Bissell as Paul Reeves, electronics dealer
 James Cardwell as Sgt. Chuck Jones
 Jack Webb as Lee Whitey
 Byron Foulger as Freddie (uncredited)
 John Dehner as Assistant Bureau Chief (uncredited)
 Kenneth Tobey as Detective (uncredited)
 John McGuire as Officer Robert Rawlins (uncredited)
 Reed Hadley as Narrator
 Dorothy Adams as Paranoid Housewife (uncredited)

Reception
Variety magazine issued a positive review:He Walked by Night is a high-tension crime thriller, supercharged with violence but sprung with finesse. Top credits for this film's wallop is shared equally by the several scripters, director Alfred Werker and a small, but superb cast headed by Richard Basehart...Starting in high gear, the film increases in momentum until the cumulative tension explodes in a powerful crime-doesn't pay climax. Striking effects are achieved through counterpoint of the slayer's ingenuity in eluding the cops and the police efficiency in bringing him to book. High-spot of the film is the final sequence which takes place in LA's storm drainage tunnel system where the killer tries to make his getaway. With this role, Basehart establishes himself as one of Hollywood's most talented finds in recent years. He heavily overshadows the rest of the cast, although Scott Brady, Roy Roberts and Jim Cardwell, as the detectives, deliver with high competence. Film is also marked by realistic camera work and a solid score.

Accolades
 Locarno International Film Festival: Special Prize, Best Police Film, Alfred L. Werker; 1949.

See also
 List of films in the public domain in the United States

References

External links

1948 films
1940s crime thriller films
American crime thriller films
American black-and-white films
American police detective films
Procedural films
Film noir
Films directed by Alfred L. Werker
Films directed by Anthony Mann
Eagle-Lion Films films
Films set in Los Angeles
Films shot in Los Angeles
1940s police procedural films
1940s English-language films
1940s American films